Private Collection may refer to:

 Private collection, a privately owned collection of works, usually a collection of art
 Private Collection (Jon and Vangelis album), 1983
 Private Collection (Miki Howard album), 2008
 Private Collection: 1979–1988, a 1988 compilation album by Cliff Richard
 The Private Collection, a 2000 album by Charlie Haden
 Private Collection (film), a 1972 Australian film